The Lancashire Evening Post is a daily newspaper based in Fulwood, a suburb of the city of Preston, Lancashire, England. According to the British Library, its first edition was published on 18 October 1886. It is known locally as the LEP.

External links
 
 

Newspapers published in Lancashire
Publications established in 1886
Evening newspapers
Mass media in Preston
Daily newspapers published in the United Kingdom
Newspapers published by Johnston Press